Joseph Stallaert (19 March 1825, Merchtem - 24 November 1903, Ixelles) was a Belgian painter; best known for his scenes from antiquity.

Life
His parents were merchants and he was originally destined for a career in business. The person he was apprenticed to, however, turned out to be the uncle of the landscape painter Edmond De Schampheleer, who discovered Stallaert's true ambitions and arranged for him to take lessons in the workshop of François-Joseph Navez. After Stallaert's father died, he openly declared his intention to be a painter. In 1839, he enrolled at the Académie Royale des Beaux-Arts and, in 1841, officially became a student of Navez.

In 1847, he was awarded the Prix de Rome and stayed in Italy until 1852. While there, he became acquainted with Alexandre Cabanel and was influenced by Raphael. Upon his return, his mentor Navez exerted some influence to obtain a contract for him to do a painting for the Brussels Town Hall ("The Death of Everard 't Serclaes"). That same year, he became Director of the Academy of Fine Arts in Tournai. In 1865, he was selected to be the first teacher of "Drawing and Painting from Nature" at the Brussels Academy and held several important positions there over the next thirty years.

In 1895, following the death of Jean-François Portaels, he became Acting Director. Three months later, on the basis of seniority, he became Director. His term of office expired in 1898and he was succeeded by the sculptor Charles van der Stappen. Due to an action by the City Council, setting seventy as a mandatory retirement age, Stallaert left the school and received a pension in 1900.

Two streets have been named after him, in Ixelles and Uccle.

Honours 
 1881: Officier in the Order of Leopold.

References

Further reading
L. Solvay, "Joseph Stallaert", in : Biographie Nationale de Belgique, XXIII, Brussel,  1921-1924.
Academie. 275 jaar onderwijs aan de Koninklijke Academie voor Schone Kunsten van Brussel (exhibition catalog), Brussels (Royal Museums of Fine Arts of Belgium), Crédit communal, 1987.

External links

 More works by Stallaert @ ArtNet
 Arcadja: More paintings by Stallaert

1825 births
1903 deaths
19th-century Belgian painters
19th-century Belgian male artists